The Greek Orthodox Archdiocese of Italy (and Malta from  until the creation of the Exarchate of Malta in 2021), officially the Sacred Orthodox Archdiocese of Italy and Exarchate of Southern Europe, is a diocese of the Ecumenical Patriarchate of Constantinople with see in Venice. The diocese was created in 1991. The current archbishop and exarch is Polykarpos Stavropoulos.

History 

The Italo-Byzantine Monastery of St Mary of Grottaferrata, 20 kilometers south of Rome, was founded by Saint Nilus the Younger in 1004.

After the fall of Constantinople, many Greeks sought refuge in Italy and the Ecumenical Patriarchate of Constantinople appointed a series of Metropolitans, who resided in Venice from 1537 to 1797. The church was completed in 1573 and is the oldest of the churches of the Greek diaspora in western Europe.

In 1557, Venice's Greek community had nominated Pachomios, bishop of Zante and Cephalonia, to act in their church as bishop, which he apparently did for one year only. In 1577 a Greek Orthodox archbishop resided in Venice who was recognized him as the religious head of the Greek Orthodox community in Venice, though with the non-Venetian title of Archbishop of Philadelphia.

Archbishops of Italy 
 Spyridon Papageorgiou (1991–1996)
 Gennadios Zervos (1996–2020)
 Polykarpos Stavropoulos (since 2021)

See also
 Eastern Orthodoxy in Italy
 Greek Orthodox Church
 San Giovanni Theristis

References

Bibliography

External links 
 Official website

Italy
Eastern Orthodox dioceses in Europe
Eastern Orthodoxy in Italy
Greek Orthodoxy in Europe
Dioceses in Italy